(born September 12, 1972 in Ginowan, Okinawa) is a Japanese former volleyball player who competed in the 1996 Summer Olympics. Hoshino played for the NEC Red Rockets from 1991 to 2000. She played as an outside hitter.

In 1996, she was eliminated with the Japanese team in the preliminary round of the Olympic tournament. Hoshino was brought on as a substitute in 4 games during the team's matches against Ukraine (3 games) and the United States (1 game), scoring no points.

References

 Monthly Volleyball February 2000 Extra Edition 6th V League Watching Guidebook (published by Nippon Bunka Shuppan)

External links
 sports-reference.com

1972 births
Living people
Japanese women's volleyball players
Olympic volleyball players of Japan
Volleyball players at the 1996 Summer Olympics